The Gobryidae are a family of five species in the genus Gobrya. Walker described the genus in 1860. They are relatively rare and found in Southeast Asia, Taiwan, Indonesia, Malaysia, the Philippines, and New Guinea. Gobryids are often metallic in coloration and their heads are wider than the rest of their bodies. Very little is known about the larval habits of these flies. McAlpine (1997) elevated the genus to family level. More research is needed to determine the best phylogenetic placement for Gobrya.

References

 

Brachycera families
Monogeneric Diptera families
Diopsoidea